is a Japanese manga, co-written and co-illustrated by Go Nagai since 1973 until its conclusion in 1990. It has had several serializations and one-shot stories which have run in the 1970s, 1980s, 1990s and 2000s. Most of the stories have been compiled in around 38 tankōbon volumes, while a few of them have been published as special tankōbon or have yet to be published in that format. Violence Jack is credited with creating the post-apocalyptic manga and anime genre.

A set of sagas from the manga were adapted in three independent OVAs released in 1986, 1988 and 1990. These OVAs have been released in the United States, Italy, France, the United Kingdom, Australia, and New Zealand. In some of these countries, the contents of the OVAs have caused censorship issues, while in Australia the second OVA was banned altogether.

The original manga reuses many concepts and characters from other works by Go Nagai.

Characters

Violence Jack
This titular antihero is a complete mystery to those who have encountered him. He is often described being 7 to 10 feet tall with the muscles of a gorilla, the fangs of a wolf, and having burning primordial eyes.

The man called Violence Jack had his name given to him for his unpredictable, violent nature and for his signature weapon, a large foldout jack-knife that he conceals and sometimes brandishes whenever necessary.

Having appeared out of nowhere after the Great Kanto Hell Quake, Jack wanders throughout Kanto, often picking street fights with those he sees as a threat to Kanto. He often helps those who are weaker than him who are preyed upon by violent nomads and criminals who scour Kanto.

Although Jack is described as human, he is often the focal point of strange phenomena that occurs in Kanto. Often when he is finished helping the weak, he will suddenly vanish without a trace of him ever actually being there.

Many of the towns he visits are often subjected to mysterious earthquakes that occur during or after his arrival. His presence alone sometimes incites those he is around to become violent and seek to attack him.

He is also shown to utilize hallucinations to those he encounters, having once shown a young woman who was planning to sell a girl into slavery where she and her boyfriend are ruthlessly slaughtered. He is also frequently accompanied by a Golden Bird that is only seen at the end of certain arcs.

Slum King

The main antagonist in the central arc of Violence Jack, Slum King is a sadistic warlord who rules over the majority of the devastated Kanto region.

Thirty years before the Hellquake, he was known as Takatora Doma and was the oldest son of the noble Doma family from Shinshu. Born with a rare medical condition that accelerates the growth of muscle tissue which can potentially be fatal. He given a heavy set of Samurai armor and an iron mask to prevent any overgrowth of muscle tissue and is locked away in a shed by his family out of fear. Doma is later given a private tutor who helps him to read and write. During later sessions, the tutor becomes aroused by Doma’s lack of sexual experience and strips naked in front of him. He later escapes his confinement after discovering his brother and tutor having sex and violently murders them and the rest of his family before disappearing.

A large giant of a man, Slum King is extremely strong and is a highly skilled swordsman. He is one of very few people who can take on Jack in a direct confrontation and survive. While his armor is meant to help in his medical condition, it also provides him with protection against most attacks. 

Violent and sadistic in nature, Slum King is widely feared throughout Kanto and is known to make anyone who angers or upsets him by cutting off their arms and legs to the joints and then cutting their tongues out to prevent them from speaking or killing themselves. After his first confrontation with Violence Jack, Slum King and is army scour the wasteland in search of his enemy.

Ryu Takuma
A young boy who survived the hell quake and became the leader to a group of children who live on the outskirts of Slum Town.

Once a fifth grade student with a good heart and innocent spirit, Ryu's world changed forever after the Great Kanto Hell Quake.

Losing all of his family, Ryu endured the new world alone and gathered a group of followers.

He initially views Jack as a savior until witnessing Jack's thirst for violence and putting him and his group at risk.

After being forced to fight against Slum King's men, Ryu becomes the leader of over three hundred children who banded together to fight Slum King.

Saotome Mondo
A criminal seeking his destiny in wasteland of Kanto. Alongside his friend Mido, Mondo escaped to Kanto but was greeted by Jack, who proceeded to attack the two.

He is killed by Jack in a duel to the death with rocket launchers but is later resurrected by Mido via alchemy.

Both he and Mido originate from the manga Gakuen Taikutsu Otoko, also known as Guerrilla High.

Plot

Violence Jack
The series takes place in the ruins of the Kanto region, after a massive earthquake (which in the OVAs was triggered by a Comet strike) dubbed 'The Great Kanto Hellquake'. Cut off from the rest of the world, the survivors of the disaster are divided between the strong and the weak, and the land becomes a haven for criminals and renegades from around the world. Violence Jack is uncovered among the rubble and demolished granite by the inhabitants of a ruined city, asking him to help the weak people and helping them destroy what, in most cases, are the strong groups commanded by killers and rapists (this is the story line of "Violence Jack: Evil Town"). In the three OVAs, Jack is requested to help different groups, such as the Zone A (later he ends up helping Zone C women) or a small town, as shown in "Hell's Wind". As for the manga, the stories change drastically, the first being the story of Violence Jack helping a group of female models in a tropical forest in Kanto by possessing a boy living in said forest in order to fight off a roving tribe of bandits. Although Jack maintains a ruthless facade, he often helps the weak, and expects nothing in return. However, Jack's unpredictable nature means that bystanders get injured or even killed on occasion as a consequence of his vicious fighting style.

When it was originally published there were several hints that pointed out the relationship between Devilman and Violence Jack. The final chapter reveals that the apocalyptic world in Violence Jack is in a world re-created by God. Satan (Ryo Asuka) is punished by being constantly humiliated by Slum King, who is the reincarnation of his second-in-command, Zennon. As part of this punishment, Ryo has had all four of his limbs removed, and is forced to walk on the stumps like a dog. Jack is actually Akira Fudo, and is one of three parts that form Devilman, the others being a child Jack and woman Jack, both of which were normally seen as birds around Jack from time to time. Eventually, Ryo regains his memories and identity as Satan, and leads his army of demons into battle alongside Zennon to resume his battle against Devilman. This time, Devilman is victorious.

Shin Violence Jack
In Shin Violence Jack, a reboot to the series, the storyline is set out somewhat differently. In this continuity, Jack is an alternate form of Amon, while Akira is now living as an amnesiac warlord known as the Skull King, with the iconic Devilman demon Jinmen as his chief subordinate. With the help of his child form, his true form as Amon, a young boy named Ushio, and the reborn Sirene (who merges with the heroic Sara, essentially becoming a Devilman), Jack leads the assault on the Skull King's fortress, succeeding in restoring Akira's memories and igniting a rivalry between the duo.

Violence Jack 20XX
Violence Jack 20XX is a condensed remake of the original series, with select events rearranged and recontextualized into a continuous narrative.

Publication

The first serialization ran from July 22, 1973, to September 29, 1974, in Weekly Shōnen Magazine, published by Kodansha. The second ran in Monthly Shōnen Magazine, also published by Kodansha, from July 1977 to December 1978, with a few gaps between months. This two serializations of Kodansha were originally published in 7 volumes.

Five years later, the serialization continued this time in the magazine Weekly Manga Goraku, published by Nihon Bungeisha, and ran from August 5, 1983, to March 23, 1990. This serialization originally produced 31 volumes in total.

On November 1, 1993, three years later after the end of the previous serialization, a special tankōbon called  was released by Nihon Bungeisha. Seven years later, on December 10, 2001, a special one-shot story, was published by Shueisha in a special edition of Weekly Young Jump, Bessatsu Young Jump #14. This story has been re-printed in GOGASHA, a two-volume compilation of short stories released in 2017.

This serialization was irregularly published, stopping on August 19, 2005, and restarting on November 2, 2007, to end on April 11, 2008, in number 17 of Weekly Comic Bunch. This series was compiled and published by Media Factory in two volumes in 2010.

In the February 2021 issue of Kodansha's Monthly Young Magazine, it was announced that a new manga series written by Yū Kinutani, titled , began serialization on February 19, 2021, and finished on November 21, 2022. As of September 20, 2022, its chapters have been collected in three tankōbon volumes.

Related media

Original video animation

Violence Jack: Harem Bomber
A few of the story arcs of the manga were adapted into OVA format. The first OVA, called , also referred to in some translations as Harlem Bomber, was released in June 1986 (some sources place the release date on June 21, 1986, although others place the release date on June 5, 1986).

A comet strikes Earth, severely damaging the Kantō region. Volcanoes erupt and huge earthquakes are unleashed, reducing many cities to rubble and killing thousands of people. In this time of weakness, a ruthless man known as the Slum King took control of the Kantō Plain by brute force and rules it with an iron fist. However, in the middle of a trek across the land with his great forces at his side, he encounters a mighty beast-like man wearing a battered green jacket and a yellow ascot who slaughters his men and then targets the Slum King himself. They clash, but their fight is interrupted by a sudden massive tsunami that separates the two.

The Slum King survives the wave and returns to his immense fortress where he tells his men that no one can dare oppose him and be permitted to live. With that said, he promptly orders his men to find and kill Violence Jack, the man whom he confronted before.

Shortly afterwards, a young woman named Mari is captured by the Slum King's army and sent to a sex camp. Her boyfriend, Ken'ichi, rescues her with the help of Violence Jack.

Before Jack, Ken'ichi and Mari can escape, Harem Bomber arrives and challenges Jack to a fight. With great difficulty, Jack manages to defeat Harem Bomber, but at the price of the life of Ken'ichi, who is killed when he is hurled out a helicopter which Jack used to subdue the Harem Bomber.

Mari awakens among the ruins, and looks up to see Jack taking the form of a gigantic golden bird, who flies away with Mari following him on foot.

Violence Jack: Evil Town
The second OVA, called , was released on December 21, 1988. It was an especially controversial entry for the classifications since some of its themes involved necrophilia and cannibalism.

Due to a massive earthquake, an underground portion of Tokyo has been separated from the outside world. Because of the limited supply of food and the constant threat of intergroup warfare, the underground city's survivors have dubbed the area Hell City. When the story begins, Evil Town has been in existence for several months.

Evil Town is split into three "sections." Section A consists of businessmen and ordinary citizens, and is the most regulated section due to the presence of police officers. Section B, which consists of criminals and lunatics, is controlled by the huge gang leader Mad Saurus and his second in command, the transsexual Blue. Section C, a former modeling agency, avoids contact with the other groups except when necessary.

Section A is attempting to dig their way back to the surface when they uncover Violence Jack, who has apparently been sealed in a rock wall since the earthquake. Section A's leaders invite Jack to stay as their protector, but the other sections have also learned of Jack's existence and call a meeting to see him for themselves.

At the meeting, the Section C leader Aila Mu offers to hire Jack as their guardian and tells him a disturbing story: After the earthquake occurred, the men of both A and B ran wild, capturing and raping the women until they learned that there was enough food for long-term survival. Many of the worst offenders are current Section A leaders, who would revert to behaving like animals if another disaster occurred. Convinced by Aila Mu's story, Jack agrees to aid Section C.

Riled by the lingering presence of Jack, Section B launches a surprise attack on Section A; as Aila predicted, A's leaders turn on one another in an attempt to survive, resulting in the near total destruction of the group. The survivors flee to Section C just as the women finish their own tunnel out of Hell City. Section B raiders arrive and finish off Section A, then begin assaulting the women. Jack defeats the raiders, killing Blue and severely wounding Mad Saurus.

Mad Saurus mourns the loss of Blue, whom he accepted despite Blue's differences. In order to combine their power, Mad Saurus consumes her corpse, transforming into a devilish red creature to battle Jack a second time. Jack is heavily wounded in the fight, but manages to defeat Mad Saurus by stabbing him through the forehead with his jackknife. Saurus stumbles around for a moment before collapsing, dead.

The battle between Mad Saurus and Jack gives Section C enough time to make their way to the surface, which is now an open, grassy plain with several ruined buildings scattered around instead of a city. Aila Mu laments that her skills as a model are useless in the ruined world, but the rest of Section C assures her that she is a capable and beloved leader.

Violence Jack: Hell's Wind
The last OVA, was released on November 9, 1990.

A short while after the cataclysms which rocked Japan, a peaceful town named 'Hope Town' has been established with the intent of returning peace to the region. The biker gang Hell's Wind show up and ransack it. Violence Jack makes his entrance here. The episode starts as a young woman, Jun, and her boyfriend, Tetsuya, are attacked. Tetsuya is murdered by Hell's Wind, and they assault and rape the terrified Jun soon after.

Jack arrives to fight the raiders, and fends off the gang by taking several gunshots which seem to have no effect on him.

Hell's Wind captures a young teacher and takes her to their camp at the Yokota Air Base. They take her top off and strap her to a fighter jet. At the behest of a little orphaned boy, Jack goes to rescue her. They try shooting him with a rocket launcher, but Jack tunnels under the ground and bursts out while being set on fire to kill everyone. The bike leader sends a messenger to their "supreme master" and request reinforcements. Jack finally kills the leader of the gang.

Jack departs, strangely heartened by speaking with the orphaned boy, who vowed to become stronger than anyone to protect the people around him.

The final scene shows another gang of horsemen coming from the distance and showing the messenger strapped to a post. A close-up is made to one of the vehicles to show the Slum King in full armor. The screen turns to black and Jack's eyes appear, as he becomes furious, and the credits begin to roll.

Release
The English releases of the OVAs were out of their original order:

Most non-Japanese versions also use the same order of the English version.

Violence Jack was originally released in an edited form in the US by Manga Entertainment. As fans wanted to see it uncut, the Right Stuf arranged with Manga Entertainment the release of an unedited version in November 1996. The label Critical Mass was created since it was considered to be too intense for the Right Stuf line. The censored version by Manga Entertainment only had dubbed audio, while the uncensored version by Critical Mass was available in both dubbed and subtitled formats. The censored version was also released in the United Kingdom by Manga Entertainment. In New Zealand, also released by Manga Entertainment, it was promoted as the banned version from Australia.

The OVAs were released in their uncut version by Manga Entertainment in France in 1999 and by Fox Pathé Europa in 2003, and in Italy by Shin Vision also in 2003.

The first release by Manga Entertainment was cut in most countries where it was released (USA, United Kingdom, New Zealand). In the UK release, the cuts amount to 30 in Evil Town of an already cut version for a total of 4:25 mins, 6:43 mins in Hell's Wind, and 25 in Slumking (Harem Bomber) and are related to sex, violence, bondage and cannibalism. The US version also has similar cuts.

The OVA with most censorship problems was Violence Jack: Evil Town. When Manga Entertainment submitted this OVA to the Australian Office of Film and Literature Classification in 1997, the OVA was refused a rating. It is suspected that this version was the already censored version from the UK (the print reviewed ran 55 mins, whereas the original print runs 60 mins.) Since this OVA was banned, the release of the rest was scrapped.

The OVAs were released uncut in Italy and France. In the United States it was also released uncut by Right Stuf under the Critical Mass label. Discotek Media released the OVA series uncut in 2015.

CB Chara Nagai Go World
The third OVA of CB Chara Nagai Go World is dedicated to the saga of Violence Jack, where it is confirmed that Jack is Akira Fudo after his battle with Satan.

Novels
Two novels were written by Yasutaka Nagai with illustrations by Go Nagai and published by Kadokawa Shoten. The first one,  was released in August 1986 while the second one, was released in April 1987.

In July 1995, another novel titled , written by Tatsuhiko Dan with illustration by Go Nagai, was released by Kodansha.

Legacy
Violence Jack is credited with creating the post-apocalyptic manga and anime genre. It depicted its post-apocalyptic setting as a desert wasteland with biker gangs, anarchic violence, ruined buildings, innocent civilians, tribal chiefs, and small abandoned villages. This was similar to, and may have influenced, the desert wasteland settings of later post-apocalyptic franchises such as the Australian film series Mad Max (1979 debut) and the Japanese manga and anime series Fist of the North Star (Hokuto no Ken, 1983 debut). Goichi Suda (Suda 51), who cited Violence Jack as an influence on his video game series No More Heroes (2007 debut), stated: “All of the desert-setting titles are actually inspired by Violence Jack. That came way before Hokuto no Ken, so that’s the real origin of everything. It’s a great Japanese comic.”

Kentaro Miura, creator of the manga and anime series Berserk (1989 debut), cited Violence Jack as an influence. Other Japanese media influenced by Violence Jack include the original video animation MD Geist (1986) and the Atlus post-apocalyptic video game series Digital Devil Story: Megami Tensei II (1990 debut). WhatCulture listed the Violence Jack anime series as having the second most gruesome death in anime history.

References

External links

1973 manga
1977 manga
1983 manga
1986 anime OVAs
1988 anime OVAs
1990 anime OVAs
1993 manga
2001 manga
2005 manga
2021 manga
Anime and manga controversies
Ashi Productions
Cannibalism in fiction
Demons in anime and manga
Devilman
Discotek Media
Films with screenplays by Shō Aikawa
Go Nagai
Horror anime and manga
Japanese novels
Kodansha manga
Manga Entertainment
Nihon Bungeisha manga
Obscenity controversies in animation
Post-apocalyptic anime and manga
Seinen manga
Shinchosha manga
Shōnen manga
Shueisha manga